The Museum and Study Centre of the Greek Theatre is a museum in Athens, Greece. It was founded by the historian of the Greek Theatre, Yiannis Sideris in 1938.

References
Official website
Hellenic Ministry of Culture and Tourism

Theatre in Greece
Museums in Athens
Theatre museums